Julian Blow is a molecular biologist, Professor of Chromosome Maintenance, and Dean of the School of Life Sciences, University of Dundee, Scotland.

Education and career 

Blow graduated with a BSc in Medical Sciences from the University of Edinburgh in 1984. He then earned his PhD in DNA replication from the University of Cambridge in 1987. Following his PhD, in 1988, he worked as a postdoctoral research fellow at the University of Oxford. In 1991 he established his own laboratory at the ICRF Clare Hall Laboratories before being promoted to Senior Scientist in 1996. The following year he moved to the University of Dundee as a Principal Investigator. In 2012 he became Director of the Centre for Gene Regulation and Expression. In 2014, he was made Director of Research for the School of Life Sciences and then, in 2016, he was appointed Dean of the School of Life Sciences.

Research 

Blow’s research focuses on understanding how chromosomes are replicated and the molecular biology behind how this is regulated. Primarily, his research investigates mechanisms which ensure that the eukaryotic genome is precisely replicated during the eukaryotic cell division cycle, so that no section of DNA are left un-replicated and no sections of DNA are replicated more than once. In important part of this control involves replication origins being “licensed” early in the cell cycle to allow for replication in the upcoming S phase. This process is important in advancing our understanding of cancer as the unchecked proliferative capacity of cancers may arise from their having lost their ability to down-regulate the licensing system. 3 In addition to this, Prof Blow has contributions extending to: a potential "constant" number for DNA replication robustness, methods for examining extracts from the South African clawed toad, Xenopus laevis that support cell cycle progression and a potential method for reprogramming somatic cells to a pluripotent state. As of July 2020, he has written 148 papers and has 12,141 citations on these papers.

Awards and honours 
Blow has received many awards, among these being the British Association for Cancer Research / Zeneca "Young Scientist of the Year" (1996), Wellcome Trust Senior Investigator Award (2011) and in 2018 in collaboration with the Näthke lab they were selected for a special collection of “outstanding” 2017/early 2018 Journal of Cell Biology articles focused on Stem Cells and Development. He was elected a Member of the European Molecular Biology Organization in 1999, Research Fellow of the Lister Institute Jenner-Centenary (1991-1996), Fellow of the Royal Society of Edinburgh (FRSE) in 2002 and Fellow of the Academy of Medical Sciences (FMedSci) in 2012.

References 

Year of birth missing (living people)
Living people